The 1983 Colgate Red Raiders football team was an American football team that represented Colgate University as an independent during the 1983 NCAA Division I-AA football season. Colgate ranked No. 7 nationally and qualified for the Division I-AA playoffs for the second year in a row, but lost in the first round.

In its eighth season under head coach Frederick Dunlap, the team compiled an 8–4 record (8–3 regular season). Gil Terenzi and Rich White were the team captains. 

A four-game winning streak to open the campaign rocketed the Red Raiders to nearly the top of the weekly national rankings, reaching as high as No. 2. They remained in the top 20 for all but one week of the year.  

The team played its home games at Andy Kerr Stadium in Hamilton, New York.

Schedule

References

Colgate
Colgate Raiders football seasons
Colgate Red Raiders football